Kennedy Catholic High School may refer to:

John F. Kennedy Catholic High School (Burien, Washington)
John F. Kennedy Catholic High School (Somers, New York)
John F. Kennedy Catholic High School (Manchester, Missouri)
Kennedy Catholic High School (Hermitage, Pennsylvania)

See also:
John F Kennedy Catholic School
John F. Kennedy High School (disambiguation)
Kennedy-Kenrick Catholic High School, in Norristown, Pennsylvania